Amylacea may refer to:

A Latinate biological word meaning starchy
Corpora amylacea, dense accumulations of calcified proteinaceous material in the ducts of prostates in older men